Mashour Haditha al-Jazy (1928-2001) was a Jordanian Lieutenant General, mostly known for participating in the Six-Day War and the Battle of Karameh.

References

Jordanian generals
1928 births
2001 deaths